The following is a timeline of the history of the city of Chișinău, Republic of Moldova.

Prior to 20th century

 1436 - Village mentioned in a document in the Principality of Moldavia.

 1752 - Măzărache Church built.
 1812
 Town becomes part of Russia.
 Population: 7,000.
 1813 - Religious Eparchy of Chișinău and Theological Seminary established.
 1817 - Anghel Nour becomes mayor.
 1818
 Town becomes capital of the Bessarabia Oblast.
 Ștefan cel Mare Central Park laid out.
 1832
 Public Library founded.
 Population: 35,000. 
 1836 - Nativity Cathedral built.
 1838 -  built.
 1840 - Triumphal Arch erected.
 1849 - Population: 42,613.
 1860 - Telegraph to Odessa begins operating.
 1862 - Population: 92,000, (inc. suburbs.)
 1871
 Calea Ferată din Moldova (railway) to Tiraspol begins operating.
 Chișinău Railway Station opens.
 1877 - April: Alexander II of Russia visits city.
 1895 - St. Teodora de la Sihla Church built.
 1897 - Population: 102,427.
 1900 - Population: 125,787.
 end of 19th C. - Chișinău Water Tower built.

20th century

 1901 - Chișinău City Hall completed.
 1902 - Transfiguration Church built.
 1903 - April: Kishinev pogrom of Jews occurs.
 1905
 October: Second Pogrom of Jews.
 Sfatul Țării Palace built.
 1913
 Cuvânt moldovenesc magazine begins publication.
 Population: 128,700.
 1917
 March: National Moldavian Party headquartered in city.
 December: Bessarabian Sfatul Țării (parliament) convenes in city.
 1918
 January: City occupied by Bolsheviks.
 City occupied by Romania.
 1921 - Capitoline Wolf statue erected.
 1925 - City becomes seat of Lăpușna County.
 1928 - Stephen the Great Monument unveiled in Ștefan cel Mare Central Park.
 1930 - Population: 114,896.
 1939 - National Museum of Fine Arts founded.
 1940
 June: Soviet occupation begins.
 August: City designated capital of the Moldavian Soviet Socialist Republic.
 10 November: 1940 Vrancea earthquake.
 Bessarabian Society of Writers established.
 1941
 Occupation of city by Romanian forces begins.
 June: Aerial bombing of city.
 Office of mayor abolished.
 Population: 52,962.
 1944
 24 August: Red Army takes city.
 Occupation of city by Romanian forces ends.
 1945
 Dinamo Stadium opens.
  founded.
 1946 - Academy of Sciences of Moldova established.
 1950
 Cinema Gaudeamus opens.
 Chișinău Botanical Garden founded.
 1952
 Artificial  created.
 Moldovan Newsreel Documentary Studio established.
 1957
 Moldova National Opera Ballet theatre opens.
 Moldova-Film studio active.
 1958 - Alley of Classics sculpture area opens in Ștefan cel Mare Central Park.
 1960 - Chișinău International Airport opens.
 1965
 Romanian Literature Museum established.
 Population: 278,000.
 1974 - Chișinău Airport terminal built.
 1977
 4 March: 1977 Vrancea earthquake.
 Sud-Est magazine begins publication.
 1978 -  and  theatre founded.
 1979 - Population: 539,000.
 1982 - Circ (cultural entity) opens.
 1983
 National Museum of History of Moldova established.
 Chișinău Water Tower rebuilt.
 1985 - Population: 624,000.
 1987
 Moldovan Writers' Union active.
 Presidential Palace complete.
 1989 - 1989 Moldovan civil unrest.
 1990 - Office of mayor re-established.
 1991
 City becomes part of the Republic of Moldova.
  established.
 Capitoline Wolf statue re-installed.
 Population: 676,700.
 1999 - Army Museum founded.
 2000
 April: Student protest.
 Institute for Public Policy established.

21st century

 2001 - Roman Catholic Diocese of Chișinău and La Strada Center for Women Rights established.
 2002 - Anti-government .
 2005 - 2005 Chișinău mayoral election held.
 2007 - Dorin Chirtoacă becomes mayor.
 2009 - April: April 2009 Moldovan parliamentary election protests.
 2011 - June: 2011 Moldovan local election held.
 2012 - January: Anti-government protest.
 2013 - 3 November: 2013 Pro Europe demonstration in Moldova.
 2014 - Population: 492,894.
 2015 - September: Anti-Timofti demonstration.

See also
 History of Chișinău
 Timeline of Chișinău (in Romanian)
 List of mayors of Chișinău
 Other names of Chișinău (e.g. Kishineff, Kishinev)

References

This article incorporates information from the Romanian Wikipedia and Russian Wikipedia.

Bibliography

External links

 Digital Public Library of America. Items related to Chișinău, various dates

Chisinau
Chișinău
Years in Moldova
Chisinau